LMR may refer to:

 Lamar (Amtrak station), Colorado, United States; Amtrak station code LMR
 Land mobile radio system
 Last Mountain Railway in Canada
 LeFrak-Moelis Records
 Leominster railway station, England; National Rail station code LMR
 Liverpool and Manchester Railway
 London Midland Region
 Longmoor Military Railway
 Longitudinal magnetic recording
 Lower Mississippi River
 Late Move Reductions
 Levin Minnemann Rudess, an album